Spring Glen is an unincorporated community in King County, Washington.

References

Unincorporated communities in King County, Washington
Unincorporated communities in Washington (state)